Woznessenskia is an Asian genus of Orthopterans, sometimes known as 'leaf-folding crickets', in the subfamily Hyperbaeninae and tribe Capnogryllacridini. Species have been recorded from southern China and Vietnam.

Species 
The Orthoptera Species File lists:
 Woznessenskia ampliata Ingrisch, 2018
 Woznessenskia arcoida Guo & Shi, 2011
 Woznessenskia arcuata Gorochov, 2002
 Woznessenskia bavi Ingrisch, 2018
 Woznessenskia bimacula Guo & Shi, 2011
 Woznessenskia brevisa Guo & Shi, 2011
 Woznessenskia combina Shi, Zhu & Wang, 2022
 Woznessenskia curvicauda (Bey-Bienko, 1962)
 Woznessenskia deminuta Gorochov, 2002
 Woznessenskia finitima Gorochov, 2002 – type species, locality Vietnam
 Woznessenskia incurva Shi, Zhu & Wang, 2022
 Woznessenskia procera Shi, Zhu & Wang, 2022
 Woznessenskia truncata Shi, Zhu & Wang, 2022

References

External links

Ensifera genera
Gryllacrididae
Orthoptera of Indo-China